Hillery is an unincorporated community in Danville Township, Vermilion County, Illinois, United States.

Geography

References

Unincorporated communities in Vermilion County, Illinois
Unincorporated communities in Illinois